Queer Creek is a stream in Hocking County, Ohio, in the United States.

Several nearby waterfalls are accessible via a hiking trail along Queer Creek.

See also
List of rivers of Ohio

References

Rivers of Hocking County, Ohio
Rivers of Ohio